Stellenberg High School  is a public dual-medium (Afrikaans and English), co-educational high school located in Stellenberg, Bellville in the Western Cape province of South Africa. It is one of the top and prestigious schools in the Western Cape. The high school was established in 1986.

History 
In 1986, "Stellenryk High School" opened its doors to 316 students and 16 faculty members. Several letters were received from parents, requesting that the school's name be changed to either Stellenberg High School or Eversdal High School. The first school day started with an assembly in the Stellenberg Dutch Reformed Church, as the school building was only partially completed at the time. Weekly assemblies later took place in a quad, until the building was completed.

The first principal, Siebert Neethling, served from 1986 until 1996.

On 23 November 1987, Stellenberg High School was officially opened by the State President, Mr. P.W. Botha.

The School Song was written by number of faculty members, including, Johan Pretorius who died in 2021 and was sung for the first time during an assembly on 5 November 1989. The school's motto, Vivat Scientia, freely translated, means:  “Let knowledge live”.

The School badge consists of two motifs in silver against a background of green and plum.  The primary motif is an ancient chair, symbolizing the acquisition and transference of knowledge. The second motif, of a crenellated castle, can be historically related to the origin of the farm, Stellenburg, as it was registered in 1705. This farm is the suburb Stellenberg today.

Principal, Theo Boonzaaier, was appointed in 1996 and retired in 2020.The acting principal is Yolandé Havinga.

Student body 
The Student body is represented by democratically elected student leaders, known as the Student Representative Council (SRC).

The SRC consists of 40 members elected from grades 9 to 12.

The Representative Council of Learners (RCL) consists of 12 members - 3 from each grade - which forms part of the SRC.

Four headleaders - a chairperson and three deputies - lead the student council.

Facilities 
Sport facilities include a sand-based astro turf, an additional hockey field, 3 rugby fields, 4 netball courts, 4 tennis courts, a multifunctional indoor activity centre, a gymnasium and a resistance-training gym.

The school has a fully functional, modern cafeteria and a function room with panoramic views of the sports fields and surroundings.

Academic facilities include numerous computer labs, an art class, design class and science labs.

The school hosted one of the rugby games of the under 18 rugby international games, which was contested between South Africa, England, Wales and France in 2018.

MTBS 
Stellenberg High School annually participates in the MTBS athletics competition, along with three other schools from the Bellville area: DF Malan, Bellville and Tygerberg. MTBS is especially well known for the performance of these schools on the pavilion where they support their athletes with LCD-like flashes and singing compilations - for which a trophy is also awarded. Stellenberg has thus far been the most successful school in acquiring the singing trophy - winning it 11 times in the past 21 years that the cup has been awarded. The School's biggest achievement was made from 2009 until 2014, where the school managed to win the singing trophy for 6 consecutive years, making it the first school to achieve this streak. In the athletics aspect, Stellenberg has been the second most successful, achieving first place for the past 6 years, consecutively.

Alumni
Selected alumni of Stellenberg High School:

Roxy Louw, surfer, international model, and actress
Natalie le Roux, race walker and South African Woman record holder in the 50 km walk
Levy Sekgapane, opera singer
Carel van der Merwe, Springbok prop
Janko Swanepoel, Bulls rugby union player
Tiaan Swanepoel, Lions rugby union player
Minki van der Westhuizen, South African model and television presenter
Angelo Davids, South African Springbok sevens rugby player. He matriculated in 2017.

References

External links
  

Schools in Cape Town
High schools in South Africa
Schools in the Western Cape